ASJ Soyaux Charente (Association Sportive Jeunesse de Soyaux Charente), commonly known as Soyaux, is a women's football club founded in 1968 and based in Soyaux, France. The club had played in France's top division except for spans of relegation to Division 2 Féminine in the 2010–11 and 2012–13 seasons, winning promotion back to the top flight each time. It also successfully appealed attempts by DNCG to relegate the club due to failed administrative reviews of its finances in both 2021 and 2022.

History
The club was founded in 1968 as AS Soyaux. In 1982, the club changed its name to Association Sportive Jeunesse de Soyaux Charente.

Honours
 D1 Féminine Champion: 1984

Players

Current squad

Former notable players
 Sylvie Bailly
 Natacha Brandy
 Martine Chapuzet
 Hawa Cissoko
 Bernadette Constantin
 Nora Coton-Pélagie
 Fernanda Da Mota
 Corinne Diacre
 Sylvie Dizier
 Valérie Dodille
 Émilie Dos Santos
 Candie Herbert
 Catherine Mercadier
 Ophélie Meilleroux
 Fiona O'Sullivan
 Françoise Paulhac
 Corinne Petit
 Florence Rimbault
 Sylvie Rousseau
 Rebecca Spencer
 Nathalie Tarade
 Nicole Turcot

Controversy
In October 2021, Samantha Johnson, player of ASJ Soyaux, expressed her dissatisfaction to media with the club following the poor working conditions she allegedly experienced during her time at Soyaux. She had been with the club for less than three months, signing in July 2021.

References

External links
 Official website 

 
Women's football clubs in France
Association football clubs established in 1968
1968 establishments in France
Division 1 Féminine clubs
Angoulême
Sport in Charente
Football clubs in Nouvelle-Aquitaine